Huddersfield Town's 1993–94 campaign was Town's last season playing at their Leeds Road stadium, before moving to the Alfred McAlpine Stadium. Neil Warnock became the Town boss following Ian Ross' decision to join ex-Town manager Mick Buxton at Sunderland. Town finished in 11th place, but a good run in the League Trophy saw Town reach a final at Wembley final for the first time since the 1938 FA Cup Final. Town did lose 3–1 on penalties to Swansea City.

Squad at the start of the season

Review
Neil Warnock's first game in charge saw Town lose 3–0 at home against Reading, which was the start of a particularly bad opening spell of the season, which saw only one win in the first 8 games. After that period was a second round League Cup match against Premier League side Arsenal. They lost the first leg 5–0 at Leeds Road, but amazingly they drew 1–1 at Highbury Stadium to lose 6–1 on aggregate.

The mid season didn't give much more joy, but a run in the League Trophy saw Town reach the area final for a two-legged play-off against Carlisle United. They won the first leg 4–1 at Leeds Road, but despite losing 2–0 at Brunton Park, they won 4–3 on aggregate to set up a final at Wembley against Swansea City. This was Town's first match at Wembley since the 1938 FA Cup Final, when they lost to Preston North End. The match was a 1–1 draw, but Town then lost 3–1 on a penalty shoot-out.

Following the defeat to promotion chasing Port Vale on 15 March, many were even wondering if Town were staying in Division 2. But that turned out to be Town's last league defeat of the season as Town won 8 of their last 12 games, so Town finished in a respectable 11th place.

Squad at the end of the season

Results

Football League Second Division

FA Cup

League Cup

League Trophy

Appearances and goals

1993-94
1993–94 Football League Second Division by team